USA-91, also known as GPS IIA-11, GPS II-20 and GPS SVN-37, was an American navigation satellite which formed part of the Global Positioning System. It was the eleventh of nineteen Block IIA GPS satellites to be launched.

Background 
Global Positioning System (GPS) was developed by the U.S. Department of Defense to provide all-weather round-the-clock navigation capabilities for military ground, sea, and air forces. Since its introduction, GPS has also developed into a valuable tool for a wide range of civilian uses and sectors, including surveying, tracking corporate vehicle fleets, and outdoor enjoyment (such as sailing, flying, and hiking). GPS employs 24 spacecraft in 20,200 km circular orbits inclined at 55.0°. These vehicles are placed in 6 orbit planes with four operational satellites in each plane.

GPS Block 2 was the operational system, following the demonstration system composed of Block 1 (Navstar 1 - 11) spacecraft. These spacecraft were 3-axis stabilized, nadir pointing using reaction wheels. Dual solar arrays supplied 710 watts of power. They used S-band (SGLS) communications for control and telemetry and Ultra high frequency (UHF) cross-link between spacecraft. The payload consisted of two L-band navigation signals at 1575.42 MHz (L1) and 1227.60 MHz (L2). Each spacecraft carried 2 rubidium and 2 Cesium clocks and nuclear detonation detection sensors. Built by Rockwell Space Systems for the U.S. Air force, the spacecraft measured 5.3 m across with solar panels deployed and had a design life of 7.5 years.

Launch 
USA-91 was launched at 00:07:00 UTC on 13 May 1993, atop a Delta II launch vehicle, flight number D220, flying in the 7925-9.5 configuration. The launch took place from Launch Complex 17A (LC-17A) at the Cape Canaveral Air Force Station (CCAFS), and placed USA-91 into a transfer orbit. The satellite raised itself into medium Earth orbit using a Star-37XFP apogee motor.

Mission 
It broadcast signal PRN 07, and operated in slot 4 of plane C of the GPS constellation. It had a design life of 7.5 years, and ceased operations on 20 December 2007.

Following decommissioning, it was kept as a reserve satellite. It was finally put in a disposal orbit approximately 1000 km above the operational constellation on 18 March 2016.

References 

Spacecraft launched in 1993
GPS satellites
USA satellites